The United States ambassador to Afghanistan is the official diplomatic representative of the United States to Afghanistan. In the wake of the 2021 fall of Kabul to the Taliban, the U.S. Embassy in Kabul transferred operations to Doha, Qatar. Since December 31, 2021, the U.S. Interests Section at the Embassy of Qatar in Kabul has served as the protecting power for the U.S. in Afghanistan.

The States recognized Afghanistan, then under the rule of King Amānullāh, on July 26, 1921. Diplomatic relations were established in 1935. The first ambassador appointed to Afghanistan was William H. Hornibrook, who was concurrently commissioned to Persia, as Iran was known then, and resided in Tehran. Until 1942, the U.S. Ambassador to Persia/Iran was also the Ambassador to Afghanistan. The U.S. Legation at Kabul was established on June 6, 1942, with Charles W. Thayer as Chargé d’Affaires ad interim. Cornelius Van Hemert Engert presented his credentials to the government of Afghanistan on July 2, 1942, as the first envoy solely accredited to Afghanistan.

Ambassador Adolph Dubs was assassinated in a botched kidnapping attempt in 1979. For the next ten years, no ambassador was appointed; only a series of chargés d’affaires represented the U.S. in Kabul. The embassy at Kabul was closed on January 30, 1989, due to concerns that the new regime would not be able to maintain security and protect diplomats following the final departure of Soviet forces from the country.

Following the overthrow of the Taliban government, the U.S. Liaison Office in Kabul opened on December 17, 2001, with Ambassador James Dobbins serving as Director. The United States recognized the Afghan Interim Administration on December 22, 2001, when it assumed the authority to represent Afghanistan in its external relations. The embassy reopened on January 17, 2002, with Ryan Crocker as Chargé d’Affaires a.i.

Ambassadors and chiefs of mission

Notes

See also
 Embassy of the United States, Kabul
 Afghanistan–United States relations
 Ambassadors of the United States
 Embassy of Afghanistan, Washington, D.C.
 Ambassadors of Afghanistan to the United States

References

United States Department of State: Background notes on Afghanistan

External links

Afghanistan
 
United States